The MWF Heavyweight Championship was a professional wrestling title in American independent promotion Millennium Wrestling Federation. The title was created when Tiger Mulligan defeated John Brooks in a 17-man "Soul Survivor" competition in Lynn, Massachusetts on May 31, 2003. The title was primarily defended in the greater Boston area as well as in southern New England. There have been a total of 7 recognized individual champions, who have had a combined 9 official reigns.

Title history

List of combined reigns

References

External links
History of the Millennium Wrestling Federation

Heavyweight wrestling championships